Gerdelat (also Romanized as Gerdelāt; also known as Gerdeh Lāt) is a village in Kalisham Rural District, Amarlu District, Rudbar County, Gilan Province, Iran. At the 2006 census, its population was 47, in 13 families.

References 

Populated places in Rudbar County